MetroKent is an underground rapid transit station and is the northern terminus on the M3 line of the Istanbul Metro. The station is located in central Başakşehir on Kanuni Sultan Süleyman Avenue and Deprem Konutları Road and is part of the MetroKent residential complex. MetroKent has an island platform serviced by two tracks.

Layout

References

Istanbul metro stations
Başakşehir
Railway stations opened in 2013
2013 establishments in Turkey